This is a demography of the population of Peru including population density, ethnicity, education level, the health of the populace, economic status, religious affiliations and other aspects of the population.

Peru is a multiethnic country, which means that it is home to people of many different historical backgrounds. Therefore, it is a multicultural country as well. Since it is a multiethnic society, Peruvian people usually treat their nationality as a citizenship instead of an ethnicity. The Peruvian census does not contain information about ethnicity so only rough estimates are available.

Population

The proportion of children below the age of 15 in 2010 was 27.9%, 65.3% were between 15 and 65 years of age, while 6.8% were 65 years or older.

Structure of the population 

Structure of the population (01.07.2013) (Estimates based on the 2007 Population Census):

Source: UN World Population Prospects

Vital statistics
Registration of vital events in Peru is not complete. The Population Departement of the United Nations prepared the following estimates.

Births and deaths

Deaths January - June 2021 =  168,138
Deaths January - June 2022 =  85,082

Fertility and births
Total Fertility Rate (TFR) (Wanted Fertility Rate) and Crude Birth Rate (CBR):

Metropolitan areas
The metropolitan areas of Peru have been formed from the urban growth of Peruvian cities more populated and they are formed by the integration of two or more municipalities. The most populated Peruvian metropolises by districts are: Lima, Trujillo, Chiclayo and Arequipa.

Ethnic groups

Peru is a multiethnic country formed by the amalgamation of different cultures and ethnicities over thousands of years.
Amerindians inhabited the land for over ten millennia before the Spanish conquest in the 16th century; their cultures and influence represent the foundation of today's Peru.

This happened mostly because of the unintended spread of germs and infectious diseases. In fact, the spread of smallpox greatly weakened the Inca empire, even before the Spanish arrival. The Amerindians did not have as much natural immunity to the disease as did the Europeans. For this reason, several Amerindian populations were decimated. Furthermore, the disease killed Inca ruler Wayna Capac, triggering a civil war in the Inca empire that preceded the conquest efforts the Spaniards. Thus, the conquest was facilitated by the weakness of the Inca empire which was recovering from both a civil war and epidemics of unknown diseases.

However, other reasons for the decrease of Amerindian population include violence during the conquest followed by the breakdown of the Inca social system and famine. The Amerindian population suffered further decrease as the Spanish exploited an Inca communal labor system called mita for mining purposes, thus killing thousands in forced labor.

Spaniards arrived in large numbers under colonial rule. After independence, there has been a gradual European immigration from Austria, England, Scotland, France, Germany, Italy, Croatia and Spain. Polynesians also came to the country lured to work in the Guano islands during the boom years of this commodity around the 1860s. Chinese arrived in the 1850s as a replacement for slave workers in the sugar plantations of the north coast and have since become a major influence in Peruvian society. Other immigrant groups include Arabs (namely from Levant/West Asian countries), South Asians, Japanese, Americans and Colombians (75,000).

Mestizos compose about 60% of the total population. The term traditionally denotes Amerindian (mostly Quechua ancestry) and European ancestry (mostly Spaniard ancestry). This term, was part of the caste classification during colonial times, whereby people of exclusive Spanish descent but born in the colonies were called criollos, people of mixed Amerindian and Spanish descent were called mestizos, those of African and Spanish descent were called mulatos and those of Amerindian and African descent were called Zambos. Nowadays, these terms have racist connotations.

Most Peruvian mestizos are of Amerindian and European descent, but other ethnic backgrounds (such as Asian and African) are also present, in varying degrees, in some segments of the mestizo population. Most mestizos are urban dwellers and show stronger European inheritance in regions like Lima Region, La Libertad Region, Callao Region, San Martín Region, Cajamarca Region, Piura Region, Amazonas Region, Lambayeque Region, and Arequipa Region.

Amerindians constitute around 30% of the total population. The two major indigenous or ethnic groups are the Quechuas (belonging to various cultural subgroups), followed by the Aymaras, mostly found in the extreme southern Andes. A large proportion of the indigenous population who live in the Andean highlands still speak Quechua and have vibrant cultural traditions, some of which were part of the Inca Empire. Dozens of indigenous cultures are also dispersed throughout the country beyond the Andes Mountains in the Amazon basin. This region is rapidly becoming urbanized. Important urban centers include Iquitos, Nauta, Puerto Maldonado, Pucallpa and Yurimaguas. This region is home to numerous indigenous peoples, though they do not constitute a large proportion of the total population. Examples of indigenous peoples residing in eastern Peru include the Shipibo, Urarina, Cocama, and Aguaruna, to name just a few.

European descendants constitute around 6% of the total population. They are descendants of the Spanish colonizers and other Europeans such as Germans, Italians, British, French, and Croatians (see also Croats) who arrived in the 19th and 20th centuries. The majority of them live also in the largest cities (like mestizos), usually in the North and Center of Peru: Lima, Trujillo, Chiclayo, Piura, and through all the highlands of Northwest, like Amazonas, Cajamarca and San Martin. The  city with a significant white population is  Trujillo.

There is also a presence of Asian Peruvians, who are primarily of Chinese and Japanese origin, constitute less than 1% of the population. Peru has the second largest population of people of Japanese descent in Latin America after Brazil and the largest population of Chinese descent in Latin America. Historic communities inhabited by people of Chinese descent are found throughout the Peruvian upper Amazon, including cities such as Yurimaguas, Nauta, Iquitos and the north central coast (Lambayeque and Trujillo). In contrast to the Japanese community in Peru, the Chinese appear to have intermarried much more since they came to work in the rice fields during the Viceroyalty and to replace the African slaves, during the abolition of slavery itself. Other Asian communities include small numbers of West Asian/Arab Peruvians, mostly of Lebanese and Syrian origin, and Palestinians, as well a small community of South Asians, namely of Hindustani and Pakistani background. There have been several notable Peruvian politicians of Asian heritage, notable past president (Alberto Fujimori), who is of Japanese origin, as well as Omar Chehade, of Lebanese heritage and served as the Second Vice President of Peru from 2011 to 2012.

The remaining is constituted by Afro-Peruvians, a legacy of Peru's history as an importer of slaves during the colonial period. Today mulattos (mixed African and European) and zambos (mixed African and Amerindian) also constitute an important part of the population, especially in Piura, Tumbes, Lambayeque, Lima and Ica regions. The Afro-Peruvian population is concentrated mostly in coastal cities south of Lima, such as those found in the Ica Region, in cities like Cañete, Chincha, Ica, Nazca and Acarí in the border with the Arequipa Region. Another large but poorly promoted segment of Afro-Peruvian presence is in the Yunga regions (west and just below the Andean chain of northern Peru), (i.e., Piura and Lambayeque), where sugarcane, lemon, and mango production are still of importance. Important communities are found all over the Morropón Province, such as in the city of Chulucanas. One of them is Yapatera, a community in the same city, as well as smaller farming communities like Pabur or La Matanza and even in the mountainous region near Canchaque. Further south, the colonial city of Zaña or farming towns like Capote and Tuman in Lambayeque are also important regions with Afro-Peruvian presence.

Socioeconomic and cultural indicators are increasingly important as identifiers. For example, Peruvians of Amerindian descent who have adopted aspects of Hispanic culture also are beginning to consider themselves "mestizo". With economic development, access to education, intermarriage, and large-scale migration from rural to urban areas, a more homogeneous national culture is developing, mainly along the relatively more prosperous coast.

Lima is home to over 8 million Peruvians, one of South America's largest urban areas, it includes the neighboring community of Callao that has grown fast and expanded since the 1960s.

Language 

According to the Peruvian Constitution of 1993, Peru's official languages are Spanish and, Amerindian languages such as Quechua, Aymara and other such indigenous languages in areas where they predominate. Today, Spanish is spoken by some 83.9% of the population.  Spanish is used by the government and the media and in education and commerce. Amerindians who live in the Andean highlands speak Quechua and Aymara and are ethnically distinct from the diverse indigenous groups who live on the eastern side of the Andes and in the tropical lowlands adjacent to the Amazon basin.

Peru's distinct geographical regions are mirrored in a socioeconomic divide between the coast's mestizo-Hispanic culture and the more diverse, traditional Andean cultures of the mountains and highlands. The indigenous populations east of the Andes speak various languages and dialects. Some of these groups still adhere to traditional customs, while others have been almost completely assimilated into the mestizo-Hispanic culture.

According to official sources, the use of Spanish has increased while the knowledge and use of indigenous languages have decreased considerably during the last four decades (1960–2000). At the beginning of the 1960s some 39% of the total Peruvian population were registered as speakers of indigenous languages, but by the 1990s the figures show a considerable decline in the use of Quechua, Aymara and other indigenous languages, when only 28% is registered as Quechua-speaking (16% of whom are reported to be bilingual in Spanish) and Spanish-speakers increased to 72%.

For 2017, government figures place Spanish as being spoken by 82.6% of the population, but among Amerindian languages, another decrease is registered. Of the indigenous languages, Quechua remains the most spoken, and even today is used by some 13.9% of the total Peruvian population or a third of Peru's total indigenous population. The number of Aymara-speakers and other indigenous languages is placed at 2.5%, and foreign languages 0.2%.

The drastic decline in use and knowledge of indigenous languages is largely attributed to the recent demographic factors. The urbanization and assimilation of Peru's Amerindian plurality into the Hispanic-mestizo culture, as well as the new socioeconomic factors associated with class structure, have given privilege to the use of Spanish at the expense of the Amerindian languages which were spoken by the majority of the population less than a century ago.

The major obstacle to a more widespread use of the Quechua language is the fact that multiple dialects of this language exist. Quechua, along with Aymara and the minor indigenous languages, was originally and remains essentially an oral language. Therefore, there is a lack of modern media which use it: for example books, newspapers, software, magazines, technical journals, etc. However, non-governmental organizations, as well as state sponsored groups, are involved in projects to edit and translate major works into the Quechua language; for instance, in late 2005 a version of Don Quixote was presented in Quechua. There has also been an increasing and organized effort to teach Quechua in public schools in the areas where Quechua is spoken.

The percentage of native speakers of Quechua who are illiterate has been decreasing lately, as 86.87% of the Peruvian population is literate. More encouraging, nationwide literacy rate of youth aged 15 to 24 years is high and considered an achievement in Peruvian educational standards.

As part of the recent push in Peru to recognize and integrate indigenous into national life, Kuczynski's government is supporting the use of indigenous languages in Peru, with the state-run TV station starting to broadcast in December 2016 a daily news program in Quechua and in April 2017 one in Aymara. The President's state-of-the-union address was simultaneously translated to Quechua in July 2017. , government figures show about 4 million (13 percent) of the population speak Quechua fluently, while up to 10 million – around a third of the population – understand some of the language.

Education 

Under the 1993 constitution, primary education is free and compulsory. The system is highly centralized, with the Ministry of Education appointing all public school teachers. Although 83% of Peru's students attend public schools at all levels, over 15% percent (usually the upper-classes and upper middle-class) attend private.

School enrollment has been rising sharply for years, due to a widening educational effort by the government and a growing school-age population. The illiteracy (2008) rate is estimated at 7.1% (10.6% for women), 19.0% in rural areas and 3.7% in urban areas .
Quechua is mostly an oral language, so in some cases, in rural areas, people do not speak Spanish and therefore do not know how to read or write. Elementary and secondary school enrollment is about 7.7  million. Peru's 74 universities (1999), 39% public and 61% private institutions, enrolled about  students in 1999.

See also
 Afro-Peruvians
 Asian Peruvians
 British Peruvian
 European Peruvians
 Indigenous peoples in Peru
 Languages of Peru
 Peruvian people
 Religion in Peru
 Roman Catholicism by country

References